State Route 26 (SR-26) is a state highway in northern Utah running for  in Weber County from Roy to Ogden.  It serves as a diagonal route through the Ogden suburbs and the primary connector from northbound I-15 to eastbound I-84 and westbound I-84 to southbound I-15.

Route description
SR-26 begins at an intersection with SR-126 in Roy and heads northeast through the Ogden suburbs on Riverdale Road, intersecting I-15 and I-84 in close proximity in Riverdale before continuing to end at an intersection with US-89 in Ogden.

History
The road from Roy to Ogden and north from was added to the state highway system in 1910, and in the 1920s it became part of US-91. In 1974, US-91 was truncated through the area, and the piece of old US-91 between SR-84 (now SR-126) in Roy and US-89 in Ogden became State Route 50. In the 1977 renumbering, SR-50 was renumbered to SR-26 (to avoid confusion with US-50).

Major intersections

References

026
Utah State Route 026
 026
Ogden, Utah
Streets in Utah